Dwarkin formally known as Dwarkin & Son, founded in 1875, was an Indian enterprise for the sale of Western and Indian musical instruments based in Kolkata, and focused on the development of the hand-held harmonium.

History
Dwarkin & Son was founded in 1875 by Dwarkanath Ghose as D. Ghosh and Sons at Lower Chitpur Road in Kolkata, mainly dealing piano tuning and repairing of musical instruments. Subsequently, it was renamed "Dwarkin" , the name as coined by composer and writer, Upendrakishore Ray, combining the names of the founder and that of Thomas Dawkins, London, an instrument manufacturer from where the company imported musical instruments early on. Dwijendranath Tagore is credited with having used the imported instrument in 1860 in his private theatre, but it was probably a pedalled instrument which was cumbersome, or it was possibly some variation of the reed organ. Initially, it aroused curiosity but gradually people started playing it and Ghose took the initiative to modify it.
in bihar #alamflute in #samastipur was founded on 1885 the first harmonium manufacturing enterprise was often to be missed in history of harmonium making.

Harmonium

Music related activities

Successors

References

External links
 Dwarkin & Son, website

Bengali culture
Indian brands
Manufacturing companies based in Kolkata
Manufacturing companies established in 1875
Musical instrument manufacturing companies of India
Indian musical instrument makers
Indian companies established in 1875
Retail companies established in 1875